The Monks of the Screw was the name of an Irish drinking club active in the period 1779–1789. It was also called the Order of St. Patrick. The "screw" referred to the corkscrew required to open a bottle of wine.

Ethos and foundation

According to the club's song, it was founded sometime in the 5th century by Ireland's patron saint: "When Saint Patrick this order established / He called us the Monks of the Screw". The real founder was John Philpot Curran, a convivial and popular wit and a lawyer at the Irish Bar. The members were liberal by contemporary standards, and some assisted in the first reforms of the penal laws. Most were lawyers or politicians in the Parliament of Ireland; Curran being both. Most supported the Irish Patriot Party.

Uniform and meeting places
The members had to wear a black poplin gown and generally met in Kevin Street, Dublin, or at Curran's house "The Priory", near Rathfarnham. Curran was jokingly described as the Prior of the Order.

Members
The membership included Lord Mornington, Lord Townshend (a former viceroy of Ireland),  John Philpot Curran,  Barry Yelverton, Father Arthur O'Leary, George Ogle, Henry Grattan, Walter Hussey Burgh, Dudley Hussey, Henry Flood, Arthur Wolfe, Arthur Gore, 2nd Earl of Arran, Jonah Barrington, William Tankerville Chamberlain, Dudley Hussey , Matthias Finucane,   Henry  Duquerry  and James Dennis.

Modern band
An eponymous Irish traditional music band comes from Sliabh Luachra in County Cork.

External links
The tune of the Monks of the Screw song, audible online

Notes

History of Ireland (1801–1923)
Organisations based in Dublin (city)
Gentlemen's clubs in Ireland
Alcohol in Ireland